Syed Murtaza Fazl Ali (20 December 1920 – 20 August 1985) judge of the Supreme Court of India and Chief Justice of the Jammu and Kashmir High Court.

Early life
He was born in an aristocratic Shia Muslim family to Khan Bahadur Sir Sayyid Fazal Ali, the Governor of Assam and Odisha. He received his primary education in St. Joseph convent, Patna (Bihar) and passed Matriculation in 1936 and B.A.(Hons.) in English in 1940. He attended the I.C.S. Coaching Classes of the Aligarh University from 1942 to 1943. He passed B.L. (Bachelor of Laws) From Patna University in First Division. He was enrolled as Advocate on 8 November 1944 and practised on Civil, Criminal, Original and Constitutional sides of the High Court as also in the Subordinate Courts.  He was also on the panel of State Lawyers. He was appointed Judge of the High Court of Jammu and Kashmir on 9 April 1958 and Chief Justice of the said High Court in December 1967. He was Chairman of the Unlawful Activities (Prevention) Tribunal in the year 1971, Vice-Chairman of the Amar Singh Club, Srinagar, a Member of the Nehru Award Jury from February 1972 to February 1975.  He was appointed Judge of the Supreme Court of India on 2 April 1975.
He died on 20 August 1985 while a sitting judge of the Supreme Court and lies buried near Dargah Shah-i-Mardan in the Jorbagh Karbala complex, Delhi.

References 

1920 births
1985 deaths
Aligarh Muslim University alumni
Faculty of Law, Aligarh Muslim University alumni
Indian Shia Muslims
Justices of the Supreme Court of India